The 2017–18 FC Ufa season was the fourth successive season in the Russian Premier League, the highest tier of association football in Russia, and fifth in total. Ufa finished the season in sixth place, qualifying for UEFA Europa League for the first time due to Tosno failing to obtain a UEFA licence after their Russian Cup victory. This meant that Krasnodar, the fourth-placed team in the Russian Premier League, entered the group stage instead of the third qualifying round, fifth-placed Zenit St.Petersburg, entered the third qualifying round instead of the second qualifying round, and sixth-placed Ufa taking the second qualifying round berth. Ufa were knocked out of the Russian Cup at the Round of 32 by Olimpiyets Nizhny Novgorod.

Squad

Out on loan

Transfers

Summer

In:

Out:

Winter

In:

Out:

Competitions

Russian Premier League

Results by round

Results

League table

Russian Cup

Squad statistics

Appearances and goals

|-
|colspan="14"|Players away from the club on loan:
|-
|colspan="14"|Players who appeared for Ufa no longer at the club:
|}

Goal scorers

Disciplinary record

References

External links

FC Ufa seasons
Ufa